Football Club des Girondins de Bordeaux, commonly referred to as Girondins de Bordeaux or simply Bordeaux, is a French professional football club based in the city of Bordeaux in Gironde, Nouvelle-Aquitaine. The team currently plays in Ligue 2, the second tier of French football, and is coached by David Guion.

Bordeaux was founded on 1 October 1881 as a multi-sports club and is one of the most successful football clubs in France. The club has won six Division 1/Ligue 1 titles, the last in 2009. Bordeaux have also won four Coupe de France titles, three Coupe de la Ligue titles, and three Trophée des champions titles as well. Bordeaux also reached the UEFA Cup final in 1996. From a year to its inception, the club's stadium was the Stade Chaban-Delmas, though since 2015, Bordeaux's home ground has been the Matmut Atlantique.

History

Beginnings 
The club took its name Girondins from the demonym for people from the region, and was founded on 1 October 1881 as a gymnastics and shooting club. The club, chaired by André Chavois, later added sports such as rowing, equestrian, and swimming, among others. It was not until 1910 when football was officially introduced to the club following strong urging from several members within the club, most notably club president Raymond Brard, though it was only available on a trial basis. The experiment with football lasted only a year before returning almost a decade later in 1919. The club contested its first official match in 1920 defeating Section Burdigalienne 12–0.

Bordeaux achieved professional status in football on 2 July 1936, partly due to the club's merger with fellow Bordelais outfit Girondins Guyenne Sport, which resulted in the club that exists today. Bordeaux's rise to professionalism came about alongside the French Football Federation's plea to increase professionalism in French football, which prior to 1932, had been non-existent. The club was inserted into the second division of French football and made its debut appearance during the 1937–38 season. The club's first manager was Spaniard Benito Díaz. Diaz brought fellow Spanish players Santiago Urtizberea and Jaime Mancisidor to the team with the latter serving as captain. The club's most prominent Frenchmen on the team were homegrown attacker Henri Arnaudeau and goalkeeper André Gérard. Bordeaux played its first official match on 23 May 1937 defeating Rhône-Alpes-based FC Scionzier 2–1 at the Stade de Colombes. The club's first ever league match was contested on 22 August losing away to Toulouse 3–2. Bordeaux recorded its first league win against Nîmes. Unfortunately for the club, the team finished 6th in the Southern region of the division. Bordeaux's disappointing finish inserted the club into the relegation playoff portion of the league where the team finished a respectable 3rd. A year later, Bordeaux moved into a new home, the Stade Chaban-Delmas, which had previously been known as, simply Parc Lescure. The facility was built specifically for the 1938 FIFA World Cup and, following the competition's completion, was designated to Bordeaux. The club had formerly played its home matches at the Stade Galin, which today is used as a training ground.

Success and stability 

On 15 October 1940, Bordeaux merged with local club AS Port and took on one of the club's most prestigious traditions, the scapular. Bordeaux ASP, which the club was now known, adorned the scapular during its run to the 1941 edition of the Coupe de France final. The match, played in occupied France at the Stade Municipal in Saint-Ouen, saw Bordeaux defeat SC Fives 2–0 with Urtizberea netting both goals. The Coupe de France triumph was the club's first major honour. Following the liberation of France, Bordeaux returned to league play and earned promotion to the first division following its 2nd-place finish during the 1948–49 season. After the season, André Gérard, now manager of the club, signed Dutchman Bertus de Harder. Led by the three-headed monster of De Harder, Édouard Kargu, and Camille Libar, Bordeaux captured its first-ever league championship, in just the club's first season in the first division, winning by six points over second place Lille. The league success led to Bordeaux being selected to participate in the second edition of the Latin Cup. In the competition, Bordeaux reached the final drawing 3–3 with Portuguese outfit Benfica. The draw forced a second match with Benfica claiming victory following an extra time goal after over two hours and 25 minutes of play.

Bordeaux maintained its title-winning aspirations finishing runners-up to Nice two seasons after winning its first title. The club also performed well in cup competitions reaching the Coupe de France final in 1952 and 1955. In 1952, Bordeaux suffered defeat to the team it finished runner-up to the same year, Nice, following a thrilling match in which eight goals were scored with five of them coming in the first 40 minutes. Bordeaux drew the match at 3–3 following a 55th-minute goal from Henri Baillot, but Nice countered minutes later with two goals in a span of four minutes to go up 5–3, which was the final result. In 1955, Bordeaux were trounced 5–2 by Lille who went up 4–0 within 35 minutes. The resulting struggles in the cup competitions led to struggles domestically with the club suffering relegation in the 1955–56 season. The club returned to the first division for the 1959–60 season, but failed to make an impact falling back to Division 2 after finishing last in the standings with 21 points.

Bordeaux returned to its former selves in the 1960s under new manager and former player Salvador Artigas. Under the helm of Artigas, Bordeaux returned to the first division and finished in a respectable fourth place for the 1962–63 season. The following season, Bordeaux returned to the Coupe de France final where the club faced off against Lyon. Bordeaux, once again, were defeated 2–0 courtesy of two goals from the Argentine Nestor Combin. The club's runner-up finish resulted in the team qualifying for the 1964–65 Inter-Cities Fairs Cup. The appearance was brief with the club losing 4–3 on aggregate to German club Borussia Dortmund. Four seasons later, Bordeaux again reached the final of the Coupe de France, the club's seventh appearance overall. The team faced Saint-Étienne and, again failed to match the achievement reached in 1941 losing 2–1. The following season, Bordeaux earned another appearance in the final, but again, failed to win the trophy losing 2–0 to Marseille. The team suffered an extreme decline during the 1970s, despite the arrival of Alain Giresse. The club played under seven different managers during the decade and consistently finished at the bottom half of the table. In 1979, the club was sold to the influential and ambitious real estate mogul Claude Bez, who positioned himself as president of the club. In the summer of 1983, Girondins de Bordeaux organised a centenary tournament; Bordeaux won a 2–0 victory over Barcelona in the semi-finals of this tournament, and in the final, the club was defeated by VfB Stuttgart.

Return to prominence in the 1980s 

Under the helm of Claude Bez, who injected millions into the club, Bordeaux flourished winning three league championships, two Coupe de France titles, and also performed well in European competitions. During Bez's run presiding over the team, he recruited several French internationals such as Bernard Lacombe, Jean Tigana, René Girard, Jean-Christophe Thouvenel, and Thierry Tusseau. Bez also brought in established manager Aimé Jacquet. Led by 1970s mainstays Giresse and Gernot Rohr, Bordeaux captured its first league championship since 1950 in the 1983–84 season finishing equal on points with Monaco, however, due to having a better head-to-head record, Bordeaux were declared champions. The next season, Bordeaux again won the league claiming the title by four points over second place Nantes. In Europe, Bordeaux played in the 1984–85 European Cup and reached the semi-finals, defeating Spanish club Athletic Bilbao, Romanian club Dinamo București, and Soviet outfit Dnipro Dnipropetrovsk before losing to Italian club Juventus. In the Coupe de France, Bordeaux finally achieved cup glory defeating Marseille 2–1 in the 1986 edition of the final with Tigana and Giresse recording both goals. The Coupe de France trophy was the club's first since 1941 after eight agonising attempts in finals. The following year the club responded by winning the trophy again; in a re-match with Marseille, Bordeaux won its second consecutive cup courtesy of goals from Philippe Fargeon and Zlatko Vujović. Bordeaux then capped off the 1986–87 Division 1 season by winning its fourth league title and achieving the double as well.

In 1989, Bordeaux ended the decade with a consecutive runners-up medal in their 1989 Ligue 1 campaign and getting up towards the semi-final in a strong European Cup run that season.

Rising from the ashes in the 1990s
Due to administrative problems, the club was relegated just two years thereafter. In 1992, however, Les Girondins won that year's Division 2 title, thus being elevated to the top tier of French football. In the emergence of young and exciting players such as playmaker Zinedine Zidane, striker Christophe Dugarry and left back Bixente Lizarazu, the club ascended even higher to win the UEFA Intertoto Cup in 1995. With this talented trio, the club defeated FC Rotor Volgograd (the 1995 King's Cup Winner), Real Betis, Milan and Slavia Prague in the second, third, quarter- and semi-finals respectively to reach the UEFA Cup final of 1996. Bordeaux witnessed even further glory only three years later, winning their fifth title in that of the 1999 Ligue 1 with winger Sylvain Wiltord winning the Golden Boot of that season with 22 goals.

Into the 2000s
During the 1999–2000 season, the club played in the new UEFA Champions League for the first time. In two seasons time Bordeaux won another piece of silverware, beating Lorient 3–0 in the 2002 Coupe de la Ligue final. Le club au scapulaire then two seasons later defeated Club Brugge 4–1 on aggregate in the fourth round to reach the 2004 UEFA Cup quarter-finals, where the club fell to eventual winners Valencia. Bordeaux got to another final in 2007 where there were eventually victorious in winning the Coupe de la Ligue of that year. Bordeaux then achieved further honours in winning the Ligue 1 and Coupe de la Ligue titles of the 2008–09 French footballing season thus achieving the first ever double in the club's history. In 2013, Bordeaux won the Coupe de France defeating Evian 3–2 in the final. In the 2013–14 Ligue 1 season, Bordeaux finished 7th in the table. In 2015, Bordeaux appointed Willy Sagnol but in 2016 Sagnol was terminated after only winning one match in the first eight games of the season and was replaced by Ulrich Rame. On 27 May 2016, Rame was replaced by Jocelyn Gourvennec. On 20 January 2018, Gourvennec was terminated and was replaced by Gus Poyet. Poyet guided Bordeaux to a 6th-placed finish at the end of the season.

In July 2018, General American Capital Partners's CEO Joseph DaGrosa pursued the purchase of the French professional football team for €70 million after 19 years of M6's ownership.

On 18 August 2018, Poyet was suspended by Bordeaux after labelling the situation as "embarrassing" when Gaëtan Laborde was sold to Montpellier without his knowledge or consent. On 5 September 2018, Ricardo Gomes was appointed as "General Manager" — he did not possess the necessary coaching badges to be officially appointed the first-team coach.

2020s, financial crisis and relegation
On 23 April 2021, citing decreased revenue due to the COVID-19 pandemic and loss of income when Mediapro, TV rights holder, went bankrupt and missed payments last year, the club was placed in administration when American owners King Street stated they would no longer support the club financially. On 22 June 2021, Bordeaux announced that Gérard López acquired the club. In the 2021–22 Ligue 1, Bordeaux finished last in the league table and were relegated to the Ligue 2, for the first time since the 1990–91 season, when they were administratively relegated due to financial difficulties. On 14 June 2022, the DNCG administratively relegated Bordeaux to the Championnat National due to financial issues. The club confirmed it will appeal the decision, citing it as 'brutal'. On 27 July 2022, Bordeaux won its appeal and was officially maintained in Ligue 2 for the 2022–23 season.

Rivalries
Bordeaux have two main rivalries, firstly the Derby de la Garonne with Toulouse FC, so named because Bordeaux and Toulouse are the two major clubs that play in cities in south-western France, both of which are on the river Garonne. The consistency and competitiveness of the rivalry developed following Toulouse's return to Ligue 1 after being administratively relegated to the Championnat National in 2001. The history of this rivalry also transcends to over 50 years and 90 derby games played between the two clubs altogether. Bordeaux also held a 44-year-old record against another big rival, Marseille. From October 1977 to January 2022, Marseille did not win away at Bordeaux's home ground.

Sponsors
Since July 2020, the equipment manufacturer of the Girondins de Bordeaux is Adidas. The club's main sponsors are the restaurant chain Bistro Régent, the online betting company Betclic and the car dealership SEAT Cupra.

Other sponsors are UNMI, Abatilles, Carlsberg, Mumm, Coca-Cola, La Bordelaise de Lunetterie, TBM, Bordeaux City Council, Gironde General Council, New Aquitaine Region.

Players

Current squad

Out on loan

Reserve squad
As of 10 January 2023

Club records

Most appearances

Top Scorers

Management and staff 
Club Management
President: Gérard Lopez
Deputy General Director: Thomas Jacquemier
Director of Football: Admar Lopes
Director in charge of Legal Affairs: Alexandre de Beaufort
Administrative and Financial Director: Axel Cornier
 Sales Director: Thomas de Corgnol
 Stadium Manager: Jérémie Latorre
 HR Director and Technical Resources: François Perroy
 Safety and Security Director: David Gil
Men's Football / Professional Squad
Manager: David Guion
Assistant manager: Jaroslav Plašil
Goalkeeping coach: Grégory Coupet
Physical Conditioning Coaches / Fitness coaches: Eric Bedouet
Doctors: Thierry Delmeule & Hervé Petit
Physios: Jacques Thebault, David Das Neves, Fabien Bouscarrat, Alexandre Renoux, Sébastien Oria, François Pucheu, David Dubourdieu & Bastien Ayçaguer
Press Relations: Aurélie Carrey & Margaux Anglade

Coaching history 
In its history, Bordeaux have had 45 coaches. The first was the Spaniard Benito Díaz. Díaz was the first Bordeaux coach to achieve an honour when, in 1941, the club won the Coupe de France. The first Bordeaux coach to win the league was André Gérard. Gérard led the team to the league crown in 1950. He also has the honour of being the club's longest-serving coach having spent a decade with the club from 1947 to 1957. Gérard is followed by Aimé Jacquet who spent nine seasons with the club in the 1980s. Under Jacquet, Bordeaux won three league titles and two Coupe de France titles.

Affiliated clubs
Newell's Old Boys, ARG
Proyecto Crecer, ARG

Honours

Domestic competitions 

 Ligue 1
 Winners (6): 1949–50, 1983–84, 1984–85, 1986–87, 1998–99, 2008–09
 Ligue 2
 Winners (4): 1937, 1944, 1953 (Reserve teams) and 1992 (Professional team)
 Coupe de France
 Winners (4): 1940–41, 1985–86, 1986–87, 2012–13
 Coupe de la Ligue
 Winners (3): 2001–02, 2006–07, 2008–09
 Trophée des Champions
 Winners (3): 1986, 2008, 2009
Coupe Gambardella
Winner (2): 1976, 2013

International competitions 
 UEFA Intertoto Cup
 Winners (1): 1995

FC Girondins de Bordeaux in European football

FC Girondins de Bordeaux first competitive European match was in the 1968–69 European Cup Winners' Cup, beating 1. FC Köln 2–1 before ultimately losing 2–4 on aggregate. Since then, the club has participated in 30 UEFA competitions, its peak being the co-champions of the 1995 UEFA Intertoto Cup and the final game of the 1995–96 UEFA Cup.

UEFA Club Coefficient Ranking
As of March 2022

Media 
From 14 August 2008 to 30 October 2018, the M6 Group carried a network about the club's activity known as Girondins TV. It carried pre-recorded matches during the season, reserve team games, training session rundowns, and a daily talk show.

References

External links 

  

 
Sport in Bordeaux
Association football clubs established in 1881
1881 establishments in France
Multi-sport clubs in France
B
Bordeaux
Ligue 1 clubs